Nakhelstan-e Galleh Dar (also Romanized as Nakhlestān-e Galleh Dār) is a village in Fal Rural District, Galleh Dar District, Mohr County, Fars Province, Iran. At the 2006 census, its population was 33, in 9 families.

References 

Populated places in Mohr County